The Yaapeet railway line (also known as the Rainbow railway line) is a standard-gauge railway line branching off of the Serviceton railway line. The line was opened in stages beginning from Dimboola to Jeparit on June 19, 1894 and reaching Yaapeet on June 25, 1914.

History 
The line was opened in stages from Dimboola to Jeparit on June 19, 1884, Jeparit to Rainbow on November 2, 1899 and Rainbow to Yaapeet on June 26, 1914.

Due to the 2011 Victorian floods, sections of the line were severely damaged and the line was closed until February 2012.

Line Guide 

Branched from the Serviceton railway line at Dimboola railway station

Arkona (formerly Katyil)

Antwerp

Tarranyurk

Jeparit

Yanac railway line branched off just after Jeparit

Ellam

Pullut

Rainbow

Albacutya

Yaapeet (formerly Turkey Bottom)

References 

Closed regional railway lines in Victoria (Australia)
Railway lines opened in 1894
Standard gauge railways in Australia